Maria Veretenina (born 26 September 1982) is an Estonian soprano opera singer.

Early life 
She was born in Tallinn. Veretenina graduated in 2010 from the Estonian Academy of Music and Theatre.

Career 
In 2011 she made her opera debut at Finnish National Opera. She performed with bass Matti Salminen. In 2019, Maria gave a sold-out solo concert at the Mariinsky Theatre’s new stage in the main Concert Hall in St Petersburg. At age 19, Maria began a series of thousands of solo concerts throughout the world including the Grand Hall of the St. Petersburg Philharmonia, the Chamber Opera in Vienna, the Royal College of Music and St. John’s Smith Square in London, Zaragoza Concert Hall and in Estonia, the opera and Estonia concert halls in Tallinn. She appears on Estonian radio and television, and sang for his Magesty King Charles III (then HRH The Prince of Wales) and the Royal Family (2016, London). Maria perfromed for the Archbishop of  Canterbury and Pope Francis in London, in 2017.

Awards 
 2006: 1st prize at Hendrik Krumm Young Singers Contest in Kuressaare (Estonia)
 2006: 1st prize at International Isabella Yurieva Competition of Russian Romance Singers in Tallinn
 2009: 3rd prize at Klaudia Taev Competition in Pärnu
 2018: 1st prize at festival-competition European Romance in Hamburg

Opera roles

Handel 
 Cleopatra Giulio Cesare
  Semele Semele
  Merab Saul
  Rinaldo, Almirena Rinaldo
  Alcina Alcina

Mozart 
  Queen of the Night Die Zauberfloete
  Konstanze Die Entfuhrung aus dem Serail
  Fiordiligi Cosi fan tutte
  Donna Anna Don Giovanni
  Zerlina Don Giovanni

Donizetti 
  Lucia Lucia di Lammermoor
  Linda Linda di Chamounix
  Norina Don Pasquale

Bellini 
 Norma Norma
 Amina La Sonnambula

Rossini 
 Rosina IL Barbiere di Siviglia
 Semiramide Semiramide

Offenbach 
 Olympia Les Contes d’Hoffmann
 Antonia Les Contes d’Hoffmann

Puccini 
 Liu Turandot
 Lauretta Gianni Schicchi
 Musetta La Boheme

Verdi 
 Violetta La Traviata 
  Guilda Rigoletto
  Aida, Voice of the High Priestess Aida

Rimsky-Korsakov 
 Marfa Tsars Bride
 Tsaritsa of Shemakha The Golden Cockerel

Mussorgsky 
 Xenia, Marina Boris Godunov

Tchaikovsky 
 Tatjana Eugene Onegin

Bach 
 Magnificat
 St. Matthew Passion
 Requiem, Missa in c, Vespers, Exsultate Jubilate

References

External links
"Maria Veretenina performances", Operabase

Living people
1982 births
Estonian operatic sopranos
Estonian Academy of Music and Theatre alumni
Singers from Tallinn
21st-century Estonian women opera singers